Millisle Road Halt railway station was on the Belfast and County Down Railway which ran from Belfast to Donaghadee in Northern Ireland.

History

The station was opened by the Belfast and County Down Railway on 1 June 1928.

The station closed to passengers in 1950, by which time it had been taken over by the Ulster Transport Authority.

References 

 
 
 

Disused railway stations in County Down
Railway stations opened in 1928
Railway stations closed in 1950
1928 establishments in Northern Ireland
1950 disestablishments in Northern Ireland
Donaghadee
Railway stations in Northern Ireland opened in the 20th century